Journey Beyond Tomorrow, reprinted with the title Journey of Joenes, is a 1962 science fiction/satire novel by American writer Robert Sheckley, first published in The Magazine of Fantasy & Science Fiction in two parts October and November 1962, and the following month by Signet Books.

Sphere science fiction London 1962 published the first full edition of the novel.

Synopsis 
The book's introduction is written by a fictional editor and compiler working at a future time after 3000 AD, narrating the adventures of Joenes, a semi-legendary figure of the 21st century whose philosophy has permeated the world until a few years before the time of writing.

From the introduction, the reader learns that this future civilization is dominated by Polynesians; that some great cataclysm overtook the world during Joenes' lifetime; that only fragmentary information of that time has survived, mostly by oral tradition carried on by story-tellers on various Pacific islands, being compiled and written down after a thousand years; and that the people of that future find it difficult to understand our time – and while knowing that it possessed some technological achievements they don't have, they don't feel envious nor are they eager to re-discover these secrets.

The bulk of the book consists of Joenes' adventures themselves. Born of parents of U.S. origin, Joenes has always lived on the tiny Pacific island of Manituatua. At 25 he loses his job and decides to visit the United States. Following his arrival there, he undergoes a series of surreal experiences, through which Sheckley describes with extreme sarcasm a society full of absurd extremes.

Just arrived Joenes gets to know Lum, who would become his lifelong companion and friend, tries Peyote, argues with the police and is mistaken for a Communist. Investigated by a commission of inquiry he is sentenced to 10 years imprisonment, but his sentence is  immediately remitted by some kind of an electronic oracle. He is co-opted as a professor in a university engaged in manifestly insane experiments and is later recruited by the government to work at the Octagon (which replaced The Pentagon). He is then sent to the Soviet Union on a secret mission but on his return the plane is mistaken for an enemy aircraft and attacked, sparking World War III.

Only some Pacific islands survive, where Joenes moves with his friend Lum.

See also
 Maurai (Poul Anderson's series, also depicting a post-apocalyptic world dominated by Polynesians)

References

Novels by Robert Sheckley
1962 American novels
Comic science fiction novels
Signet Books books